In mathematics, Abel's identity (also called Abel's formula or Abel's differential equation identity) is an equation that expresses the Wronskian of two solutions of a homogeneous second-order linear ordinary differential equation in terms of a coefficient of the original differential equation.
The relation can be generalised to nth-order linear ordinary differential equations. The identity is named after the Norwegian mathematician Niels Henrik Abel.

Since Abel's identity relates the different linearly independent solutions of the differential equation, it can be used to find one solution from the other. It provides useful identities relating the solutions, and is also useful as a part of other techniques such as the method of variation of parameters. It is especially useful for equations such as Bessel's equation where the solutions do not have a simple analytical form, because in such cases the Wronskian is difficult to compute directly.

A generalisation to first-order systems of homogeneous linear differential equations is given by Liouville's formula.

Statement
Consider a homogeneous linear second-order ordinary differential equation

 

on an interval I of the real line with real- or complex-valued continuous functions p and q.

 

satisfies the relation

 

for every point x0 in I.

Remarks
 Abel's theorem is particularly useful if , because it implies that  is constant.

Proof

 

 

 

is a well-defined function. Differentiating both sides, using the product rule, the chain rule, the derivative of the exponential function and the fundamental theorem of calculus, one obtains

Generalization
Consider a homogeneous linear th-order ordinary differential equation

 

on an interval  of the real line with a real- or complex-valued continuous function . The generalisation of Abel's identity states that the Wronskian  of  real- or complex-valued solutions  of this th-order differential equation, that is the function defined by the determinant

 

satisfies the relation

 

Direct proof
It suffices to show that the Wronskian solves the first-order linear differential equation

because the remaining part of the proof then coincides with the one for the case .

Therefore, assume  in the following.

The derivative of the Wronskian  is the derivative of the defining determinant. It follows from the Leibniz formula for determinants that this derivative can be calculated by differentiating every row separately, hence

 

However, note that every determinant from the expansion contains a pair of identical rows, except the last one. Since determinants with linearly dependent rows are equal to 0, one is only left with the last one:

 

Since every  solves the ordinary differential equation, we have

 

for every .

Proof using Liouville's formula
The solutions  form the square-matrix valued solution

of the -dimensional first-order system of homogeneous linear differential equations

References

 Abel, N. H., "Précis d'une théorie des fonctions elliptiques"  J. Reine Angew. Math., 4  (1829)  pp. 309–348.
 Boyce, W. E. and DiPrima, R. C. (1986). Elementary Differential Equations and Boundary Value Problems, 4th ed. New York: Wiley.
 
 

Articles containing proofs
Mathematical identities
Ordinary differential equations
Niels Henrik Abel